Acleris nectaritis is a species of moth of the family Tortricidae. It is found in India (Nigrili Hills).

References

Moths described in 1912
nectaritis
Moths of Asia